The Warren County Technical School District is a technical and vocational public school district serving students in ninth through twelfth grades, along with programs for adult learners, located in Washington borough, and serving the entire community of Warren County, New Jersey, United States.

As of the 2015-16 school year, the district and its one school had an enrollment of 478 students and 43.5 classroom teachers (on an FTE basis), for a student–teacher ratio of 10.99:1.

The district offers "a comprehensive high school education, athletics, and student life found at a traditional high school setting with the added focus of vocational and career training based on current industry standards"

School 
Warren County Technical School had an enrollment of 478 students as of the 2015-16 school year. The student's local school district is responsible for tuition and to provide transportation to the school.
Derrick Forsythe, Principal
Jeff Tierney, Assistant Principal

Administration
Core members of the district's administration are:
Derrick Forsythe, Acting Superintendent
Amy Barkman, Business Administrator

References

External links
Warren County Technical School
School overview

Data for Warren County Technical School, National Center for Education Statistics

Washington, New Jersey
New Jersey District Factor Group none
School districts in Warren County, New Jersey
Vocational school districts in New Jersey